Golovin is a lunar impact crater that is located to the southeast of the walled plain Campbell. It lies in the northern hemisphere on the Moon's far side, and cannot be seen directly from the Earth. Just two crater diameters to the southwest of Golovin is the larger crater Appleton, and to the north is Langevin.

The nearly circular rim of Golovin is not markedly eroded, and is not overlaid by any impacts of note. There is a slight outward bulge to the northwest. The inner walls are relatively wide, and have slumped slightly near the top edge. There is a formation of central ridges at the midpoint of the interior. The interior floor is otherwise small and relatively level.

Satellite craters
By convention these features are identified on lunar maps by placing the letter on the side of the crater midpoint that is closest to Golovin.

References

 
 
 
 
 
 
 
 
 
 
 
 

Impact craters on the Moon